PNH can stand for:

 Police Nationale d’Haïti
 Police Nationale d’Haïti Football Club
 National Party of Honduras
 Paroxysmal nocturnal hemoglobinuria
 Parelli Natural Horsemanship
 IATA Airport Code for Phnom Penh International Airport